The James Bay Athletic Association is a Canadian rugby club based in Victoria, British Columbia. The JBAA were formed in 1886 and are said to be the oldest sports organization west of Montreal.

James Bay play their home games at MacDonald Park in Victoria, British Columbia. JBAA play rugby from September through April, running three men’s rugby teams, a women’s team, and Under-19 and Under 16 youth teams.

History
JBAA has won 54 Vancouver Island Barnard Cup championships – and a record 24 British Columbia Rounsefell Cup championships. In the 2005/2006 season, JBAA won the Barnard Cup, the Rounsefell Cup, and the inaugural Canada Club Championship.

Titles
Rounsefell Cup: 24
1925, 1938, 1939, 1940, 1946, 1963, 1974, 1975, 1976, 1977, 1978, 1979, 1980, 1982, 1989, 1992, 1993, 1996, 1999, 2006, 2007, 2008, 2013, 2014

Notable players
The James Bay Athletic Association has produced a large number of players who have played representative rugby both in Canada and internationally.

See also
 Rugby union in Canada

External links
James Bay Athletic Association

Sport in Victoria, British Columbia
Rugby union teams in British Columbia